The European Young Conservatives (EYC) is a grouping of youth wings of conservative and centre-right political parties in Europe.

As of 2014, the group has a membership of 25 political youth organisations from 22 different countries and territories, in addition to four associated members. The EYC is independent and not affiliated with any European political party, but maintains a non-exclusive relationship with the Alliance of Conservatives and Reformists in Europe (formerly known as the European Conservatives and Reformists).

The EYC is a full member of the International Young Democrat Union.

History
The EYC was founded in August 1993 by the youth wings of the British Conservative Party, Danish Conservative People's Party, and Icelandic Independence Party, under the leadership of Andrew Rosindell, then-chairman of the UK's Young Conservatives.

It emerged from a split in the centre-right Democrat Youth Community of Europe (DEMYC), which separated into two factions: the larger part, following a broadly Christian democratic philosophy; and the smaller part, led by Rosindell, following a broadly conservative philosophy. Two crucial points of disagreement were the scope of economic liberalisation and the desirability of a federal Europe.

From 1993 to 1997, the group was led by Rosindell.  The group gave training to newly established democratic political parties in Russia, Belarus, and Azerbaijan. It was refounded much later by Oliver Cooper.

The EYC generally holds three conference events per year, with the largest being the autumn Freedom Summit.

Freedom Summit
 Cambridge, United Kingdom - 2014
 Cambridge, United Kingdom - 2015
 Porto, Portugal - 2016
 Warsaw, Poland - 2017

Summer Camp
 Stockholm, Sweden - 2014
 Tbilisi, Georgia 2016
 Prague, Czech Republic - 2017
 Leptokarya, Greece - 2018
 Leptokarya, Greece - 2019

Annual Congress
 Warsaw, Poland - 2012
 Prague, Czech Republic - 2013
 Istanbul, Turkey - 2014
 Prague, Czech Republic - 2015
 Brussels, Belgium - 2016
 London, United Kingdom - 2017
 Warsaw, Poland - 2018
 Amsterdam, Netherlands - 2019

Since 2016, an internal conflict between civic and ethnic nationalists has emerged within the EYC. The ethnic nationalists were opposed to the membership of Turkish and Israeli parties and claimed the EYC has "replaced anti-immigration politics with free market capitalism". Resulting from the dispute, the Finns Party Youth announced its withdrawal on May 18, 2017, with its leader Samuli Voutila saying: "We cannot be members in the same organization as the new Turkish sultan’s youth wing, when it acts against European values." On June 12, the Estonian movement Blue Awakening sent a letter to the EYC demanding the expulsion of the Turkish AK Party Youth within seven days. The letter was later published on Richard B. Spencer's website Altright.com.

Membership
The EYC has twenty-five member organisations:

Associate members

Former members

Footnotes

Conservatism in Europe
Politics of Europe
International Young Democrat Union
 
Youth organizations established in 1993
Political organisations based in the United Kingdom